Georges Leclerc (19 December 1904 – 11 June 1973) was a French runner. He competed in the steeplechase at the 1924 Summer Olympics, but failed to reach the final. He also took part in the International Cross Country Championships in 1926–1929 and 1931–1932, and won two gold and one silver medals with the French team.

References

1904 births
1973 deaths
French male middle-distance runners
French male long-distance runners
French male steeplechase runners
Olympic athletes of France
Athletes (track and field) at the 1924 Summer Olympics
Athletes from Paris
20th-century French people